2011 Turkey earthquake may refer to:

 2011 Kütahya earthquake in May, two deaths
 2011 Van earthquake in October, several hundred deaths, with aftershocks in November

See also
List of earthquakes in Turkey